This is a list of notable private schools in Nashville, Tennessee:

Nashville proper

Christ Presbyterian Academy
Davidson Academy
Donelson Christian Academy
Ensworth School
Ezell-Harding Christian School
Father Ryan High School
Franklin Road Academy
Goodpasture Christian School
Harding Academy
Harpeth Hall School
Lipscomb Academy
Madison Academy
Montgomery Bell Academy
Nashville Christian School
Pope John Paul II High School
St. Cecilia Academy
St. Paul Christian Academy
University School of Nashville

Metropolitan area

Davidson County
Columbia Academy
Father Ryan High School
Franklin Road Academy

Williamson County
Battle Ground Academy
Brentwood Academy

See also
List of high schools in Tennessee#Davidson County

References

Private schools in Tennessee
Nashville

Private schools